Thomisus is a genus of crab spiders (family Thomisidae) with around 142 species described. The genus includes species that vary widely in their ecology, with some that are ambush predators that feed on insects visiting flowers. Like several other genera in the family Thomisidae, they are sometimes referred to as flower crab spiders, from their crab-like motion and their way of holding their front legs, reminiscent of a crab spreading its claws as a threat.

Description and behavior

Many species are brightly colored, usually matching the color of the flower in which they are waiting in ambush. Not all species are flower-dwelling, but among those that are, at least some species can change their colour over a period of some days to match the flower colour. Studies suggest that bees are inclined to avoid a flower that contains a spider-sized object of a non-matching colour; whether this is specifically a mechanism for avoiding crab spiders, or simply that they are not attracted to flowers whose nectar guides are obscured however, is a more difficult question. The colour changes that such species can achieve are typically in ranges of white, pink, and yellow.

For example, in Thomisus spectabilis, the method of camouflage is similar to the Misumena vatia, though T. spectabilis are visible to their prey, but not their predators. This species of crab spiders is UV reflective while the flower is UV absorbing creating a contrast between the spider and flower through the eyes of the pollinator. The contrast created greatly attracts pollinators such as honeybees. This evolutionary method of camouflage increased the likelihood the crab spiders encountered prey, which in turn effects the fitness of the crab spiders. Due to the increased encounter rate of prey the spiders are able to focus energy on reproduction therefore leading to increased fitness in the spiders. The evolutionary method of camouflage greatly increases the survivability and fitness of crab spiders.

Distribution

The distribution of Thomisus species is almost worldwide, with the notable exception of most of South America. Although Thomisus species can be found almost anywhere on earth, most species occur in the tropics and the warmer regions of the Old World, with fewer species in the region from New Guinea to Australia and the New World. Only Thomisus guadahyrensis is known from South America (in Peru).

Species

, the World Spider Catalog accepted 142 species:               
                
Thomisus albens O. Pickard-Cambridge, 1885 – Pakistan, Yarkand
Thomisus albertianus Strand, 1913 – Gabon, Congo, Uganda, Angola
Thomisus albertianus guineensis Millot, 1942 – Guinea, Angola
Thomisus albertianus maculatus Comellini, 1959 – Cameroon, Congo
Thomisus albertianus verrucosus Comellini, 1957 – Congo
Thomisus albohirtus Simon, 1884 – North, East Africa, Yemen
Thomisus amadelphus Simon, 1909 – Vietnam
Thomisus andamanensis Tikader, 1980 – India, Andaman Is.
Thomisus angulatulus Roewer, 1951 – Gabon
Thomisus angustifrons Lucas, 1858 – Gabon
Thomisus arabicus Simon, 1882 – Yemen
Thomisus armillatus (Thorell, 1891) – Nicobar Is.
Thomisus ashishi Gajbe, 2005 – India
Thomisus australis Comellini, 1957 – Central, Southern Africa
Thomisus baghdeoi Gajbe, 2004 – India
Thomisus bargi Gajbe, 2004 – India
Thomisus beautifularis Basu, 1965 – India
Thomisus benoiti Comellini, 1959 – Congo
Thomisus bicolor Walckenaer, 1837 – USA
Thomisus bidentatus Kulczyński, 1901 – West Africa to Saudi Arabia, Yemen
Thomisus bigibbosus Keyserling, 1881 – USA
Thomisus blandus Karsch, 1880 – Africa, Yemen
Thomisus boesenbergi Lenz, 1891 – Madagascar
Thomisus bonnieri Simon, 1902 – Oman
Thomisus bueanus Strand, 1916 – Cameroon
Thomisus bulani Tikader, 1960 – India
Thomisus callidus (Thorell, 1890) – Sri Lanka, Singapore, Sumatra, Nias Is., Java
Thomisus cancroides Eydoux & Souleyet, 1841 – Unknown
Thomisus candidus Blackwall, 1866 – Tropical Africa
Thomisus castaneiceps Simon, 1909 – Vietnam
Thomisus cavaleriei Schenkel, 1963 – China
Thomisus citrinellus Simon, 1875 – Mediterranean, Africa, Seychelles, Yemen, Socotra, Iraq
Thomisus congoensis Comellini, 1957 – Central, Southern Africa
Thomisus dalmasi Lessert, 1919 – Africa
Thomisus danieli Gajbe, 2004 – India
Thomisus daradioides Simon, 1890 – South Africa to India
Thomisus daradioides nigroannulatus Caporiacco, 1947 – East Africa
Thomisus dartevellei Comellini, 1957 – Congo, Ethiopia, Malawi
Thomisus dentiger (Thorell, 1887) – Myanmar
Thomisus destefanii Caporiacco, 1941 – Ethiopia
Thomisus dhakuriensis Tikader, 1960 – India
Thomisus dhananjayi Gajbe, 2005 – India
Thomisus duriusculus (Thorell, 1877) – Sulawesi
Thomisus dyali Kumari & Mittal, 1997 – India
Thomisus elongatus Stoliczka, 1869 – India
Thomisus eminulus Tang & Li, 2010 – China
Thomisus galeatus Simon, 1909 – Vietnam
Thomisus ghesquierei Lessert, 1943 – Congo
Thomisus godavariae Reddy & Patel, 1992 – India
Thomisus gouluensis Peng, Yin & Kim, 2000 – China
Thomisus granulatus Karsch, 1880 – Southern Africa
Thomisus granulifrons Simon, 1906 – India, Sri Lanka
Thomisus guadahyrensis Keyserling, 1880 – Peru
Thomisus guangxicus Song & Zhu, 1995 – China
Thomisus hararinus Caporiacco, 1947 – Ethiopia
Thomisus hui Song & Zhu, 1995 – China
Thomisus hunanensis Peng, Yin & Kim, 2000 – China
Thomisus ilocanus Barrion & Litsinger, 1995 – Philippines
Thomisus iswadus Barrion & Litsinger, 1995 – Philippines
Thomisus italongus Barrion & Litsinger, 1995 – Philippines
Thomisus janinae Comellini, 1957 – Congo, Tanzania
Thomisus jocquei Dippenaar-Schoeman, 1988 – Malawi
Thomisus kalaharinus Lawrence, 1936 – Africa, Yemen
Thomisus katrajghatus Tikader, 1963 – India
Thomisus keralae Biswas & Roy, 2005 – India
Thomisus kitamurai Nakatsudi, 1943 – Ryukyu Is.
Thomisus kiwuensis Strand, 1913 – Central Africa
Thomisus kokiwadai Gajbe, 2004 – India
Thomisus krishnae Reddy & Patel, 1992 – India
Thomisus labefactus Karsch, 1881 – China, Korea, Taiwan, Japan
Thomisus laglaizei Simon, 1877 – Myanmar, Philippines, Java, Sumatra
Thomisus lamperti Strand, 1907 – Madagascar
Thomisus leucaspis Simon, 1906 – India, New Caledonia
Thomisus litoris Strand, 1913 – Central Africa
Thomisus lobosus Tikader, 1965 – India
Thomisus ludhianaensis Kumari & Mittal, 1997 – India
Thomisus machadoi Comellini, 1959 – Angola, Cape Verde Is., South Africa
Thomisus madagascariensis Comellini, 1957 – Madagascar
Thomisus madagascariensis pallidus Comellini, 1957 – Madagascar
Thomisus magaspangus Barrion, Barrion-Dupo & Heong, 2013 – China
Thomisus manishae Gajbe, 2005 – India
Thomisus manjuae Gajbe, 2005 – India
Thomisus marginifrons Schenkel, 1963 – China
Thomisus meenae Gajbe, 2005 – India
Thomisus melanostethus Simon, 1909 – Vietnam
Thomisus mimae Sen & Basu, 1963 – India
Thomisus modestus Blackwall, 1870 – Italy
Thomisus natalensis Lawrence, 1942 – Southern Africa
Thomisus nepenthiphilus Fage, 1930 – Sumatra
Thomisus nirmali Saha & Raychaudhuri, 2007 – India
Thomisus obscuratus Caporiacco, 1947 – East Africa
Thomisus obtusesetulosus Roewer, 1961 – Senegal
Thomisus ochraceus Walckenaer, 1841 – Algeria
Thomisus odiosus O. Pickard-Cambridge, 1898 – Mexico
Thomisus okinawensis Strand, 1907 – Thailand to Ryukyu Is., Philippines, Indonesia
Thomisus onustus Walckenaer, 1805 (type species) – Palearctic
Thomisus oscitans Walckenaer, 1837 – USA
Thomisus pateli Gajbe, 2004 – India
Thomisus pathaki Gajbe, 2004 – India
Thomisus penicillatus Simon, 1909 – Vietnam
Thomisus perspicillatus (Thorell, 1890) – Borneo, Sulawesi
Thomisus pooneus Tikader, 1965 – India
Thomisus pritiae Gajbe, 2005 – India
Thomisus projectus Tikader, 1960 – India
Thomisus pugilis Stoliczka, 1869 – India
Thomisus rajani Bhandari & Gajbe, 2001 – India
Thomisus retirugus Simon, 1909 – Vietnam
Thomisus rigoratus Simon, 1906 – India
Thomisus rishus Tikader, 1970 – India
Thomisus roeweri Comellini, 1957 – Tanzania
Thomisus schoutedeni Comellini, 1957 – Congo
Thomisus schultzei Simon, 1910 – Southern Africa
Thomisus scrupeus (Simon, 1886) – Africa
Thomisus shillongensis Sen, 1963 – India
Thomisus shivajiensis Tikader, 1965 – India
Thomisus sikkimensis Tikader, 1962 – India
Thomisus simoni Gajbe, 2004 – India
Thomisus socotrensis Dippenaar-Schoeman & van Harten, 2007 – Socotra
Thomisus sorajaii Basu, 1963 – India
Thomisus spectabilis Doleschall, 1859 – India to Australia
Thomisus spiculosus Pocock, 1901 – West, Central, Southern Africa
Thomisus stenningi Pocock, 1900 – Africa, Seychelles, Yemen
Thomisus stigmatisatus Walckenaer, 1837 – USA
Thomisus stoliczkai (Thorell, 1887) – Myanmar
Thomisus sundari Gajbe & Gajbe, 2001 – India
Thomisus swatowensis Strand, 1907 – China
Thomisus telanganaensis Pravalikha & Srinivasulu, 2015 – India
Thomisus tetricus Simon, 1890 – Yemen
Thomisus transversus Fox, 1937 – China
Thomisus tripunctatus Lucas, 1858 – West Africa
Thomisus tuberculatus Dyal, 1935 – Pakistan
Thomisus unidentatus Dippenaar-Schoeman & van Harten, 2007 – Yemen, Iraq, Iran
Thomisus venulatus Walckenaer, 1841 – Algeria
Thomisus viveki Gajbe, 2004 – India
Thomisus vulnerabilis Mello-Leitão, 1929 – Myanmar
Thomisus wangi Tang, Yin & Peng, 2012 – China
Thomisus whitakeri Gajbe, 2004 – India
Thomisus yemensis Dippenaar-Schoeman & van Harten, 2007 – Yemen
Thomisus zaheeri Parveen, Khan, Mushtaq, Ahmad & Rana, 2008 – Pakistan
Thomisus zhui Tang & Song, 1988 – China
Thomisus zuluanus Lawrence, 1942 – South Africa
Thomisus zyuzini Marusik & Logunov, 1990 – Turkey, Saudi Arabia to Central Asia

References

Thomisidae
Araneomorphae genera
Cosmopolitan spiders